The year 1949 in archaeology involved some significant events.

Events
 November 21–23 - First Internationales Sachsensymposion held.
University of New Mexico transfers lands to the National Park Service and expands Chaco Canyon National Monument, with the proviso that the university may continue scientific research.

Excavations
 February 15 - Gerald Lankester Harding and Roland de Vaux begin excavations at Cave 1 of the Qumran Caves in the West Bank region of Jordan, the location of the first seven Dead Sea Scrolls.
 Excavation work recommences at the Peking Man Site in Zhoukoudian, China.
 Alberto Ruz Lhuillier begins excavations of the Temple of the Inscriptions, Palenque.
 Seton Lloyd begins excavations at Sakçagözü.
 Grahame Clark begins excavations at Star Carr, North Yorkshire (continues to 1951).
 Conclusion of excavations in the Vatican Necropolis.

Finds
 Radiocarbon dating technique discovered by Willard Libby and his colleagues during his tenure as a professor at the University of Chicago.
 Anak Tomb No. 3 (dated 357 CE) found in North Korea.
 New excavations at Peking Man Site in Zhoukoudian, China unearth 5 teeth and fragments of thigh and shin bone.
 First new discoveries of Nimrud ivories by British School of Archaeology in Iraq led by Max Mallowan.
 12th century murals discovered in Coombes Church, West Sussex, England.

Publications
 'C. W. Ceram' - Götter, Gräber und Gelehrte (Gods, Graves and Scholars: the story of archaeology).
 T. D. Kendrick - Late Saxon and Viking Art.

Awards

Births
 Dolores Piperno - American archaeologist

Deaths
 23 April - Percy Newberry, English archaeologist (b. 1869)

References

Archaeology
Archaeology
Archaeology by year